Federal Highway 90 (Carretera Federal 90) connects Irapuato, Guanajuato  to Zapotlanejo, Jalisco near Guadalajara. Federal Highway 90 has two main segments.

The first segment runs westward from Zapotlanejo, Jalisco eastward to Irapuato, Guanajuato and connects to Guadalajara via Mexican Federal Highway 80. The total length of the highway segment is 217.6 km (135.2 mi). The second segment runs westward from Mascota, Jalisco eastward to Ameca, Jalisco. The total length of the highway segment is 118.1 km (73.4 mi). Federal Highway 90 connects to Puerto Vallarta via Jalisco State Highway 70.

The highway is under the management of the Secretariat of Communications and Transportation of Mexico and custody is under the responsibility of "The Federal Road Police" (a part of the Federal Preventive Police, PFP). The road runs through the center of Mexico from west to east.

The road connects the following cities from west to east: Zapotlanejo, Ocotlán, Degollado, La Piedad,  Pénjamo, Abasolo, and Irapuato.

References

090